Sipiński (feminine: Sipińska) is a Polish surname. Notable people with the surname include:

Urszula Sipińska (born 1947), Polish singer-songwriter, architect, and writer

See also
Lipiński

Polish-language surnames